Fawaz Daoud Sultan Abdullah Al-Khater (born September 27, 1981) is a Qatari footballer, who currently plays for  El Jaish. He is the brother of Nayef Al Khater, and cousin of Meshal Mubarak.

Career
Fawaz and his brother, Naif, started their sports career training in gymnastics while they were very young. Every day after school, they would go home directly to practice gymnastics in their yard. They were also accompanied by Meshal Mubarak, their maternal cousin. They were swayed to turn to football and join Al Arabi's youth team by Mubarak Mustafa. He eventually advanced to the senior team of Al Arabi, before moving to Umm Salal in 2009.

The defender joined in August 2010 on loan to Lekhwiya and returned to his club Umm Salal in January 2011.

Notes

1981 births
Living people
Lekhwiya SC players
Al-Arabi SC (Qatar) players
Umm Salal SC players
El Jaish SC players
Muaither SC players
Qatar Stars League players
Qatari footballers
Footballers at the 2002 Asian Games
Association football defenders
Asian Games competitors for Qatar
Qatar international footballers